The 2010–11 Qatari 2nd Division season is the bottom level football championship in Qatar, and it started in November.

Teams
El Jaish were promoted to the Qatar Stars League.

League table

Top scorers

See also
2010–11 Qatar Stars League
Qatari 2nd Division

References

Qatar
2010–11 in Qatari football